Snooker world rankings 2016/2017: The professional world rankings for all the professional snooker players, who qualified for the 2016–17 season, are listed below. The rankings work as a two-year rolling list. The points for each tournament two years ago are removed when the corresponding tournament during the current season finishes. The following table contains the rankings, which were used to determine the seedings for certain tournaments.

Notes

References

2016
Rankings 2016
Rankings 2017